Sham Shui Po is an MTR station located in Sham Shui Po, New Kowloon, Hong Kong. Sham Shui Po's colour is dark green. The station has an island platform arrangement which serves two tracks.

History
On 10 May 1982, Tsuen Wan line opened to the public, but Sham Shui Po station did not open until 17 May, a week later.

Station layout

Entrances and exits
These are located within the quadrant bounded by Kweilin Street (NW), Pei Ho Street (SE), Fuk Wa Street (NE) and Apliu Street (SW).

References

MTR stations in Kowloon
Tsuen Wan line
Sham Shui Po
Railway stations in Hong Kong opened in 1982
1982 establishments in Hong Kong